The Loveland Chamber of Commerce is a membership-based organization of more than 700 companies and 16,000 individuals in northern Colorado and serves as the driving force for business in Loveland, promoting business and community prosperity. The Chamber focuses on four pillars to accelerate and sustains businesses: connections, visibility, education and advocacy. The Loveland Chamber is one of the founding members of the Northern Colorado Legislative Alliance, along with the Fort Collins and Greeley chambers of commerce.

The Chamber provides events, programs and opportunities to educate investors about current business trends. The Chamber is responsible for the Old Fashioned Corn Roast Festival, one of Loveland’s largest community festivals  and the Loveland Valentine Re-mailing Program in addition to supporting day-to-day events in the Loveland community.

Advocacy
The Loveland Chamber advocates at the local, state, regional and federal levels on policy impacting northern Colorado. This mission is accomplished through committee involvement in legislative affairs, by providing resources for investors to contact government officials and participate in public hearings and its involvement in the Northern Colorado Legislative Alliance.

As a founding member of the Northern Colorado Legislative Alliance (NCLA), a joint public policy organization developed in conjunction with the Fort Collins & Greeley Chambers of Commerce, and the [Northern Colorado Economic Development Corporation] (NCEDC).

The Local Legislative Affairs Committee is a Chamber-appointed and board of directors endorsed committee. Its mission is to favorably influence the actions of local government for the enhancement of a positive business environment. This group identifies potential issues impacting the business community and evaluates these issues before recommending appropriate action to the Loveland Chamber and its board of directors. The Local Legislative Affairs Committee also serves as a liaison between investors in the Chamber and the Northern Colorado Legislative Alliance.

The Chamber provides resources for investors to contact legislators and find out information on issues including how to effectively write a letter to editors of newspapers and congressmen and how to testify on issues during a city council or county commission hearing.

Connections

Stir
Stir Loveland is a northern Colorado connection forum for young professionals. The group aims to create a comfortable atmosphere for young professionals to connect through social events, community involvement, educational programs and relationship building groups. The goal of Stir is to equip the next generation of business and community leaders to ensure northern Colorado's future economic and cultural vitality.

Business Before Hours/Business After Hours
These events are monthly, casual networking opportunities hosted by Chamber investors to provide an opportunity for investors to meet new and potential strategic partners and customers.

Committees
The Loveland Chamber has several committees, composed of investors.

Ambassadors: The Ambassadors serve as the visible "goodwill arm" of the Chamber. They assist the promotion of the Chamber and its members. They are responsible for new membership growth and existing membership retention.

Corn Roast Committee: This committee oversees the Corn Roast Festival and the numerous mini-events that fall under the Corn Roast Festival such as the corn cooking, contests, entertainment, marketing and parade.

Executive Committee: This committee consists of the officers of the Loveland Chamber of Commerce board of directors. Their job is to provide a direct link between the board and staff and oversee the immediate needs of the board.

Finance Committee: This committee assists the board of directors by overseeing the  Chamber's financials and assuring the chamber staff is adhering to the fiscal policies established by the board of directors.

Leadership Loveland Advisory Committee: This committee oversees the objectives, reviews the class progress and secures the focus of the chamber leadership program. See below for more information on the Leadership Loveland program.

Local Legislative Affairs Committee: The mission of this committee is to influence the actions of local government for the enhancement of positive business environment. Members identify potential policy issues impacting the business community and economic environment, study and evaluate policy issues, recommending appropriate action to the Loveland Chamber board of directors (all chamber positions will be determined by the Chamber board), promote the public policy goals of the Chamber, serve as a liaison between the investors of the Loveland Chamber of Commerce and the board of directors of the Northern Colorado Legislative Alliance, and engage and educate Chamber investors in the public policy process

Marketing Resource Committee: This group assists the Chamber and its investors with a variety of marketing opportunities including the Sweetheart City Business Decorating Contest, social media and capitalizing on marketing opportunities through the Chamber.

Visibility
The Loveland Chamber provides some promotional services for investors to increase their visibility in the community. After joining the Chamber, investors are thrown a ribbon cutting ceremony to welcome them to the Chamber. The photos and video from the ceremony are posted on the Chamber’s social media pages and on the website. The Loveland Chamber also provides traditional methods of promotion for its investors including a member directory with the opportunity to post pictures, video and links. Investors may also write blogs and sponsor events and programs. The Chamber recognizes a Featured Monthly Investor through the website and its social media channels.

Education
The Loveland Chamber provides opportunities for members to develop their business skills and learn current business trends by attending educational events and programs.

Leadership Loveland
The program offers one-day seminars every month focused on topics such as: business and the economy, state government, public safety/natural resources and media. Leadership Loveland is sponsored by McKee Medical Center in Loveland, Colo.

Social media
The Loveland Chamber uses social media as a means for reaching out to investors for networking and educational purposes. The Loveland Chamber actively uses Facebook, Twitter and LinkedIn to start conversations and inform investors about events, business trends, legislative affairs and community news.

Involvement in the Community

Old Fashioned Corn Roast Festival
The Old Fashioned Corn Roast Festival is one of the largest and oldest community festivals in Loveland. It is a family event celebrating the end of summer typically held at the end of August. The two-day event includes a parade, live music, corn shucking contest, recipe contests, corn eating contest, vendors, activities hot, fresh corn and more. All events are sponsored by businesses in the Loveland community.

Valentine’s Day
Due to its name, Loveland, Colorado is very involved in Valentine’s Day related activities. The Loveland Chamber runs several of these programs and helps others promote theirs.

The most famous Valentine’s program from Loveland is the Loveland Valentine Re-mailing Program. This is an annual program held by the Loveland Chamber of Commerce and the Loveland Post Office. People from around the world can mail valentines to the Loveland Postmaster to be stamped with a unique cachet and verse and a special postal cancellation, then mailed to their final destination. The program has been running for 70 years and each year there is a different cancellation, cachet and verse. All the valentines are stamped by volunteers from the community, mostly senior citizens. There is a waiting list of more than 50 individuals to fill stamping positions.  Information on how to mail valentines is available on the Loveland Chamber’s website.

The Valentine Re-mailing Program inspired the Loveland Chamber to produce the, “official Loveland valentine card” each year. Each year the design on the card and the inside verse are created by local artists and residents. These cards are sold throughout northern Colorado in retail stores like Walmart, Safeway and Hallmark, and they are sold online.

Since 1962, the Loveland Chamber has selected a Miss Loveland Valentine. There are currently 50 Miss Loveland Valentine’s.

Thompson Valley Rotary Heart’s Program is not arranged by the Loveland Chamber of Commerce, but it is a long running tradition in Loveland. For more than 40 years, volunteers have decorated wooden hearts with words of affection and attached them to lamp posts and telephone poles lining the streets of Loveland.

References 

Chambers of commerce in the United States
Organizations based in Colorado
Loveland, Colorado